The 2022 FIA ETCR – eTouring Car World Cup was the second season of the touring car series for electric cars known as Pure ETCR Championship in its inaugural season in 2021. The season began on 6 May 2022 at the Circuit de Pau-Ville and ended on 25 September 2022 at Sachsenring. Adrien Tambay succeeded teammate Mattias Ekström as the drivers' champion, while Cupra EKS repeated its manufacturers' title.

Teams and drivers

Calendar
The calendar for the second season featuring seven events across Europe and Asia was revealed in December 2021. On 17 May, it was announced that Istanbul round was postponed to November due to the organizational issues: On 29 June, it was announced that Inje round was cancelled due to the logistical challenges in Asia: On 16 August, it was announced that Sachsenring round replaced Istanbul round as the season finale.

Results and standings

Results

 Scoring system

Drivers' championship

Manufacturers' championship

References

External links
 

FIA ETCR
FIA ETCR